Hassan Niazi (born 3 February 1981) is a Pakistani film and television actor.

Early life 
Niazi was born on 3 February 1981 in Lahore, Pakistan. He completed his school and college education from Lahore and started his career as an actor.

Career 
Niazi's debut was a short role as Irfan in Fever in 2007, and subsequently acted in Ramchand Pakistani and Maalik.

In 2019, he played Arun Verani in Sherdil. The film was Niazi's first major box-office success, and grossed Rs. 5.17 crore in the first five days of its release.

Filmography

Film

Television

References

External links 

Pakistani male television actors
Living people
Pakistani male models
Male actors from Lahore
Pakistani male film actors
1981 births
People from Lahore